PF-219,061 is a drug that was under development by Pfizer which acts as a potent and highly selective agonist for the dopamine D3 receptor. It was under development as a potential medication for the treatment of female sexual dysfunction.  It did not advance into clinical trials.

See also 
 ABT-670
 ABT-724
 Cabergoline
 Bremelanotide
 Flibanserin
 Intrinsa
 Melanotan II
 OSU-6162
 PF-592,379
 Pramipexole
 Tibolone
 UK-414,495

References 

Dopamine agonists
Female sexual dysfunction drugs
Phenylmorpholines
Phenols
Pfizer brands
Abandoned drugs
Aphrodisiacs